The Conestoga Creek Viaduct spans the Conestoga River east of Lancaster, Pennsylvania. The present structure, built in 1887–88, is a five-span, two-track stone arch railroad bridge. The first crossing at this location was a  series of 11 wooden Town lattice trusses constructed in 1829 for the Columbia and Philadelphia Railroad, which was purchased by the Pennsylvania Railroad (PRR) and incorporated into its main line in 1857. PRR shortened the viaduct and replaced the remaining wooden trusses with iron Whipple trusses in 1863. The 1887-88 stone arch replacement was originally intended to be four tracks wide, but only half of the superstructure width (two tracks) was constructed, leaving an unfinished spandrel wall on the southern face. Tie rods were added in 1930 to brace the spandrel walls.

See also
List of bridges documented by the Historic American Engineering Record in Pennsylvania
List of crossings of the Conestoga River

References

External links

Bridges completed in 1888
Bridges in Lancaster County, Pennsylvania
Bridges over the Conestoga River
Pennsylvania Railroad bridges
Railroad bridges in Pennsylvania
Historic American Engineering Record in Pennsylvania
Viaducts in the United States
Stone arch bridges in the United States
1888 establishments in Pennsylvania